The 2014–15 Wessex Football League season (known as the Sydenhams Football League (Wessex) for sponsorship reasons) was the 29th in the history of the Wessex Football League since its establishment in 1986.

The league consists of two divisions: the Premier Division and Division One.

Premier Division

The Premier Division featured 21 teams, one fewer than last season, after Sholing were promoted to the Southern League, and Downton and Romsey Town were relegated to Division One.

Two teams joined the division:
Andover Town, runners-up in Division One.
Petersfield Town, champions of Division One.

Salisbury City, who were removed from the Football Conference due to their financial problems, applied to the Wessex League for entry for the 2014–15 season. This was despite the fact that the league had already started, with some clubs having played seven matches. The club was still threatened with liquidation in the High Court. However, the application was rejected by the league due to problems within the club's structure on and off the pitch, and the ongoing court cases.

The following clubs applied for promotion to Step 4: AFC Portchester, Blackfield & Langley, Moneyfields, Petersfield Town and Winchester City.

Petersfield Town were promoted as champions, and after another place opened up in the Southern League in June 2015, Winchester City were also promoted.

League table

Stadia and locations

Results

Division One
Division One featured 15 teams, reduced from the 17 teams which competed last season, after Hayling United and Stockbridge resigned, and Andover Town and Petersfield Town were promoted to the Premier Division.

Two clubs joined the division:
Downton, relegated from the Premier Division.
Romsey Town, relegated from the Premier Division.

League table

Stadia and locations

Results

References

External links
 Wessex Football League official site

Wessex Football League seasons
9